The National Insurance (Industrial Injuries) Act 1946 was a British Act of Parliament which provided compensation paid by the Ministry of National Insurance to workers who were left injured or disabled as a result of work-related accidents. The Act replaced the Workmen's Compensation Acts.

The act was universal, in the sense that it covered the entire workforce. It provided injury benefit for six months, disability benefit for the permanently injured, and a death benefit for dependents. Tribunals were set up to assess cases rather than the burden of proving a case resting on the claimant, although claims still remained hard to prove.

The Act's limitation of the right to appeal was considered in R v Medical Appeal Tribunal, ex p Gilmore where Lord Denning decided that the provision limiting appeal does not mean that the judiciary cannot review decisions.

References 

United Kingdom Acts of Parliament 1946
Social security in the United Kingdom
National Insurance